The Ben Venue Rural Historic District encompasses a large rural historic landscape in northeastern Rappahannock County, Virginia. This area was developed agriculturally beginning in the mid-18th century by wealthy Virginia families, around what was one of the region's first turnpikes, and has maintained its rural character in the intervening centuries. Prominent properties in the district include the 1844 Ben Venue estate and the 1773 Battle Run Primitive Baptist Church.

The district was added to the National Register of Historic Places in 2016.

See also
National Register of Historic Places listings in Rappahannock County, Virginia

References

Historic districts on the National Register of Historic Places in Virginia
National Register of Historic Places in Rappahannock County, Virginia